Walter A. Friedman is an American academic. He received his PhD in American History from Columbia University in 1996. He serves as a Lecturer of Business Administration and the Director of the Business History Initiative at the Harvard Business School. He is the co-editor of the Business History Review with Geoffrey Jones.

Works

References

Living people
Harvard Business School faculty
Business historians
Year of birth missing (living people)